Francisco Olivares Maldonado (1564 – 8 March, 1632) was a Roman Catholic prelate who served as Auxiliary Bishop of Toledo (1626–1632).

Biography
Francisco Olivares Maldonado was born in Granada, Spain in 1564 and ordained a priest in the Order of Saint Augustine. On 7 September 1626, he was appointed during the papacy of Pope Urban VIII as Auxiliary Bishop of Toledo and Titular Bishop of Siriensis. He served as Auxiliary Bishop of Toledo until his death on 8 March 1632. While bishop, he was the principal co-consecrator of Agustin de Hinojosa y Montalvo, Bishop of Nicaragua (1630); Pedro Moya Arjona, Bishop of Tui (1631); and Facundo de la Torre, Archbishop of Santo Domingo (1632).

References 

17th-century Roman Catholic bishops in Spain
Bishops appointed by Pope Urban VIII
1564 births
1632 deaths
Clergy from Granada
Augustinian bishops